Yamaguchi 4th district (山口県第4区 Yamaguchi-ken dai-yon-ku) is a single-member electoral district for the House of Representatives, the lower house of the National Diet of Japan. It is located in Western Yamaguchi and consists of the cities of Shimonoseki and Nagato. The seat was most recently held by former Prime Minister of Japan Shinzo Abe until his assassination in July 2022. As of September 2011, 266,456 voters were registered in the district, giving its voters well above average (347,878 voters per district) vote weight. Unlike many prefectures where the capital is also the most populous city, Yamaguchi's major city is Shimonoseki, located at the western tip of Honshū and adjacent to Kyushu island's Fukuoka-Kitakyūshū metropolitan area which lies just south across the Kanmon Straits.

Yamaguchi is home to the Kan Abe - Nobusuke Kishi-Shintarō Abe (non-prime minister, father of Shinzo Abe)-Eisaku Satō prime ministerial family whose members have represented the prefecture in the Diet for much of the postwar era and the Giichi Tanaka prime ministerial family that produced its first two elected governors. Western Yamaguchi formed the four-member 1st district until the electoral reform of the 1990s, its representatives included Shintarō Abe, Shinzō Abe (former Prime Minister of Japan) and Tatsuo Tanaka, but also other prominent conservatives such as finance minister Yoshirō Hayashi or Takeo Kawamura who went on to become Chief Cabinet Secretary in the 2000s. 

The Liberal Democratic Party (LDP) usually won the district three seats to one. In the electoral reform, the 1st district was split up into the single-member 3rd and 4th districts. In the first post-reform election of 1996, the 4th district was contested by Shinzō Abe and Takaaki Koga, himself a former Liberal Democrat who in 1993 took the opposition seat in the 1st district from the Socialists for the Renewal Party. But Abe won, and has easily held onto the seat since. He was elected LDP president and Prime Minister in 2006 against Tarō Asō and Sadakazu Tanigaki in succession to Junichiro Koizumi (Kanagawa 11th district), but resigned after one year.

In 2012, the party – in opposition since 2009 – once more elected Shinzo Abe as the third LDP president not to become prime minister immediately after his election. Abe then subsequently won the 2012 general election in a landslide victory against the DPJ of Yoshihiko Noda (Chiba 4th district), returning the LDP to power (with coalition partner New Komeito, the LDP have a two-thirds majority and can break a deadlock in the National Diet) and became prime minister again.

List of representatives

Election results

References

Yamaguchi Prefecture
Districts of the House of Representatives (Japan)
1996 establishments in Japan
Constituencies established in 1996
Shinzo Abe